Roger William Carter (25 August 1934 – 21 February 2022) was a British mathematician who was emeritus professor at the University of Warwick. He defined Carter subgroups and wrote the standard reference Simple Groups of Lie Type. He obtained his PhD at the University of Cambridge in 1960 and his dissertation was entitled Some Contributions to the Theory of Finite Soluble Groups, with Derek Taunt as thesis advisor. Carter died in Wirral on 21 February 2022, at the age of 87.

Publications

Simple Groups of Lie Type by Roger W. Carter, 
Lie Algebras of Finite and Affine Type (Cambridge Studies in Advanced Mathematics) by Roger Carter,

References

Roger Carter Obituary

1934 births
2022 deaths
British mathematicians
Academics of the University of Warwick
Alumni of the University of Cambridge
Group theorists
Institute for Advanced Study visiting scholars